The Angolan Roller Hockey Cup is the second tier roller hockey competition in Angola, following the league. The annual competition is contested by all roller hokey clubs in the country in a head-to-head knock-out format.

Scores

Titles by team

See also
 Angola Roller Hockey Super Cup
 Angolan Roller Hockey League
 Supertaça de Angola (football)
 Taça de Angola (basketball)
 Taça de Angola (handball)

References

Roller hockey competitions in Angola
2005 establishments in Angola